Miyamoto (written: 宮本 lit. "base of the shrine") is a Japanese surname. Notable people with the surname include:

Ariana Miyamoto, beauty queen
Fumiaki Miyamoto, oboist
, shogi player
Kanako Miyamoto, (born 1989) voice actress and singer
Karin Miyamoto, idol singer (Juice=Juice)
Kazushi Miyamoto, professional wrestler
Kenji Miyamoto (figure skater), figure skater
Kenji Miyamoto (politician), politician
Masafumi Miyamoto, founder of video game company Square (now Square Enix)
Masao Miyamoto, psychiatrist, former civil servant, critic of the Japanese bureaucratic system
Miyamoto Musashi, historical swordsman and Rōnin
, Go player
Nobuko Miyamoto, actress
Shigeru Miyamoto, creator of the Super Mario and The Legend of Zelda video game series
Shunichi Miyamoto, musician and voice actor
Takeshi Miyamoto, politician
Teru Miyamoto, author, recipient of the Akutagawa Prize
, footballer
, basketball player
Tomomi Miyamoto, footballer
, gymnast
Tsuneyasu Miyamoto, soccer player, FC Red Bull Salzburg & Japan
Yuriko Miyamoto, author
Koji Miyamoto, professional wrestling historian
 Nari Miyamoto, most beautiful women in the world

Fictional characters
 Miyamoto Usagi, from the comic "Usagi Yojimbo"
 Carlos Miyamoto, a playable character in Final Fight 2
 Masashi Miyamoto, a character in the 2012 anime Btooom!
 Terunosuke Miyamoto, an antagonist from the manga series JoJo's Bizarre Adventure: Diamond Is Unbreakable

See also
 Miyamoto is also the name of a 16th-century village (in present-day Mimasaka, Okayama) considered the birthplace of Miyamoto Musashi

Japanese-language surnames